Anne Cecilia Gyllenhammar (born 10 August 1961 in Gothenburg) is a Swedish author.

Family 
Cecilia Gyllenhammar has two sisters, Charlotte Gyllenhammar and Sophie Gyllenhammar Mattson, and a brother, Oscar Gyllenhammar. She was married to documentary film director Fredrik von Krusenstjerna between 1995 and 2008, and is the mother of three children. The oldest daughter of Pehr G. Gyllenhammar, CEO of Volvo 1970-1994, and Christina (née Engellau), she grew up as the "Princess of Gothenburg".  She gave up both studies in the US and a career as a journalist before devoting herself to her children.

Career 
Her novel En spricka i kristallen ("A crack in the crystal") published in 2004 tells the story of the childhood of "Suss", an upper class girl from Gothenburg and the daughter of a CEO.  Many details in the novel are from Cecilia's own childhood, but the plot also contains purely fictional parts.  In the novel, Suss suffers of bulimia and marries a documentary film director - details the author admits are from her own life, while the factuality of other details, such as the constantly unfaithful father and the mother who tells her desperate daughter to lose 15 kilos, signs a check and leaves, remains a secret.  In an interview in 2007, she said "you make a choice when you tell about unpleasant things not meant to be public" and that she had lost contact with her parents.

, her first novel has become a major success and is being turned into a film for Sveriges Television directed by Harald Hamrell and Cecilia von Krusenstjerna is working on a second novel which, she intends, will be written from the perspective a middle class person and deal with the benefits of having a lot of money and those who are dreaming of it.

Bibliography
 En spricka i kristallen, April 2004, Bonnier Fakta,

Notes

References
  ("I lied about my family name", an interview with Cecilia von Krusenstjerna.)
 
 

1961 births
Living people
Writers from Gothenburg
Swedish women writers
Swedish women novelists
Swedish people of Jewish descent
Swedish nobility